An isogon may refer to:

 Isogonal figure - a polygon or polyhedron with all of its vertices equivalent under the symmetries of the figure.
 A type of contour line Contour line#Types